A low-pass filter is a filter that passes signals with a frequency lower than a selected cutoff frequency and attenuates signals with frequencies higher than the cutoff frequency. The exact frequency response of the filter depends on the filter design. The filter is sometimes called a high-cut filter, or treble-cut filter in audio applications. A low-pass filter is the complement of a high-pass filter.

In optics, high-pass and low-pass may have different meanings, depending on whether referring to frequency or wavelength of light, since these variables are inversely related. High-pass frequency filters would act as low-pass wavelength filters, and vice versa.  For this reason it is a good practice to refer to wavelength filters as short-pass and long-pass to avoid confusion, which would correspond to high-pass and low-pass frequencies.

Low-pass filters exist in many different forms, including electronic circuits such as a hiss filter used in audio, anti-aliasing filters for conditioning signals prior to analog-to-digital conversion, digital filters for smoothing sets of data, acoustic barriers, blurring of images, and so on. The moving average operation used in fields such as finance is a particular kind of low-pass filter, and can be analyzed with the same signal processing techniques as are used for other low-pass filters.  Low-pass filters provide a smoother form of a signal, removing the short-term fluctuations and leaving the longer-term trend.

Filter designers will often use the low-pass form as a prototype filter.  That is, a filter with unity bandwidth and impedance.  The desired filter is obtained from the prototype by scaling for the desired bandwidth and impedance and transforming into the desired bandform (that is low-pass, high-pass, band-pass or band-stop).

Examples
Examples of low-pass filters occur in acoustics, optics and electronics.

A stiff physical barrier tends to reflect higher sound frequencies, and so acts as an acoustic low-pass filter for transmitting sound. When music is playing in another room, the low notes are easily heard, while the high notes are attenuated.

An optical filter with the same function can correctly be called a low-pass filter, but conventionally is called a longpass filter (low frequency is long wavelength), to avoid confusion.

In an electronic low-pass RC filter for voltage signals, high frequencies in the input signal are attenuated, but the filter has little attenuation below the cutoff frequency determined by its RC time constant. For current signals, a similar circuit, using a resistor and capacitor in parallel, works in a similar manner.  (See current divider discussed in more detail below.)

Electronic low-pass filters are used on inputs to subwoofers and other types of loudspeakers, to block high pitches that they cannot efficiently reproduce. Radio transmitters use low-pass filters to block harmonic emissions that might interfere with other communications. The tone knob on many electric guitars is a low-pass filter used to reduce the amount of treble in the sound. An integrator is another time constant low-pass filter.

Telephone lines fitted with DSL splitters use low-pass filters to separate DSL from POTS signals (and high-pass vice versa), which share the same pair of wires (transmission channel).

Low-pass filters also play a significant role in the sculpting of sound created by analogue and virtual analogue synthesisers. See subtractive synthesis.

A low-pass filter is used as an anti-aliasing filter prior to sampling and for reconstruction in digital-to-analog conversion.

Ideal and real filters

An ideal low-pass filter completely eliminates all frequencies above the cutoff frequency while passing those below unchanged; its frequency response is a rectangular function and is a brick-wall filter.  The transition region present in practical filters does not exist in an ideal filter.  An ideal low-pass filter can be realized mathematically (theoretically) by multiplying a signal by the rectangular function in the frequency domain or, equivalently, convolution with its impulse response, a sinc function, in the time domain.

However, the ideal filter is impossible to realize without also having signals of infinite extent in time, and so generally needs to be approximated for real ongoing signals, because the sinc function's support region extends to all past and future times.  The filter would therefore need to have infinite delay, or knowledge of the infinite future and past, in order to perform the convolution.  It is effectively realizable for pre-recorded digital signals by assuming extensions of zero into the past and future, or more typically by making the signal repetitive and using Fourier analysis.

Real filters for real-time applications approximate the ideal filter by truncating and windowing the infinite impulse response to make a finite impulse response; applying that filter requires delaying the signal for a moderate period of time, allowing the computation to "see" a little bit into the future.  This delay is manifested as phase shift.  Greater accuracy in approximation requires a longer delay.

An ideal low-pass filter results in ringing artifacts via the Gibbs phenomenon. These can be reduced or worsened by choice of windowing function, and the design and choice of real filters involves understanding and minimizing these artifacts. For example, "simple truncation [of sinc] causes severe ringing artifacts," in signal reconstruction, and to reduce these artifacts one uses window functions "which drop off more smoothly at the edges."

The Whittaker–Shannon interpolation formula describes how to use a perfect low-pass filter to reconstruct a continuous signal from a sampled digital signal.  Real digital-to-analog converters use real filter approximations.

Time response

The time response of a low-pass filter is found by solving the response to the simple low-pass RC filter. 

Using Kirchhoff's Laws we arrive at the differential equation

Step input response example 
If we let  be a step function of magnitude  then the differential equation has the solution

where  is the cutoff frequency of the filter.

Frequency response 
The most common way to characterize the frequency response of a circuit is to find its Laplace transform transfer function, . Taking the Laplace transform of our differential equation and solving for  we get

Difference equation through discrete time sampling 
Taking the difference between two consecutive samples we have

Solving for  we get

Where 

Error analysis 
Comparing the reconstructed output signal from the difference equation, to the step input response, we find that there is an exact reconstruction (0% error). This is the reconstructed output for a time invariant input.

Discrete-time realization

Many digital filters are designed to give low-pass characteristics. Both infinite impulse response and finite impulse response low pass filters as well as filters using Fourier transforms are widely used.

Simple infinite impulse response filter

The effect of an infinite impulse response low-pass filter can be simulated on a computer by analyzing an RC filter's behavior in the time domain, and then discretizing the model.

From the circuit diagram to the right, according to Kirchhoff's Laws and the definition of capacitance:

where  is the charge stored in the capacitor at time  . Substituting equation  into equation  gives , which can be substituted into equation  so that

This equation can be discretized. For simplicity, assume that samples of the input and output are taken at evenly spaced points in time separated by  time. Let the samples of  be represented by the sequence , and let  be represented by the sequence , which correspond to the same points in time.     Making these substitutions,

Rearranging terms gives the recurrence relation

That is, this discrete-time implementation of a simple RC low-pass filter is the exponentially weighted moving average 

By definition, the smoothing factor is within the range . The expression for     yields the equivalent time constant  in terms of the sampling period  and smoothing factor  ,

Recalling that
 so 

and

If   =0.5,   then the RC time constant is equal to the sampling period.

The filter recurrence relation provides a way to determine the output samples in terms of the input samples and the preceding output.  The following pseudocode algorithm simulates the effect of a low-pass filter on a series of digital samples:

 // Return RC low-pass filter output samples, given input samples,
 // time interval dt, and time constant RC
 function lowpass(real[1..n] x, real dt, real RC)
     var real[1..n] y
     var real α := dt / (RC + dt)
     y[1] := α * x[1]
     for i from 2 to n
         y[i] := α * x[i] + (1-α) * y[i-1]
     return y

The loop that calculates each of the n outputs can be refactored into the equivalent:

     for i from 2 to n
         y[i] := y[i-1] + α * (x[i] - y[i-1])

That is, the change from one filter output to the next is proportional to the difference between the previous output and the next input. This exponential smoothing property matches the exponential decay seen in the continuous-time system. As expected, as the time constant  RC  increases, the discrete-time smoothing parameter  decreases, and the output samples  respond more slowly to a change in the input samples ; the system has more inertia.  This filter is an infinite-impulse-response (IIR) single-pole low-pass filter.

Finite impulse response
Finite-impulse-response filters can be built that approximate to the sinc function time-domain response of an ideal sharp-cutoff low-pass filter. For minimum distortion the finite impulse response filter has an unbounded number of coefficients operating on an unbounded signal. In practice, the time-domain response must be time truncated and is often of a simplified shape; in the simplest case, a running average can be used, giving a square time response.

Fourier transform

For non-realtime filtering, to achieve a low pass filter, the entire signal is usually taken as a looped signal, the Fourier transform is taken, filtered in the frequency domain, followed by an inverse Fourier transform. Only O(n log(n)) operations are required compared to O(n2) for the time domain filtering algorithm.

This can also sometimes be done in real-time, where the signal is delayed long enough to perform the Fourier transformation on shorter, overlapping blocks.

Continuous-time realization

There are many different types of filter circuits, with different responses to changing frequency.  The frequency response of a filter is generally represented using a Bode plot, and the filter is characterized by its cutoff frequency and rate of frequency rolloff. In all cases, at the cutoff frequency, the filter attenuates the input power by half or 3 dB. So the order of the filter determines the amount of additional attenuation for frequencies higher than the cutoff frequency.

The magnitude Bode plot for a first-order filter looks like a horizontal line below the cutoff frequency, and a diagonal line above the cutoff frequency. There is also a "knee curve" at the boundary between the two, which smoothly transitions between the two straight line regions. If the transfer function of a first-order low-pass filter has a zero as well as a pole, the Bode plot flattens out again, at some maximum attenuation of high frequencies; such an effect is caused for example by a little bit of the input leaking around the one-pole filter; this one-pole–one-zero filter is still a first-order low-pass. See Pole–zero plot and RC circuit.
 A second-order filter attenuates high frequencies more steeply. The Bode plot for this type of filter resembles that of a first-order filter, except that it falls off more quickly. For example, a second-order Butterworth filter reduces the signal amplitude to one fourth its original level every time the frequency doubles (so power decreases by 12 dB per octave, or 40 dB per decade). Other all-pole second-order filters may roll off at different rates initially depending on their Q factor, but approach the same final rate of 12 dB per octave; as with the first-order filters, zeroes in the transfer function can change the high-frequency asymptote. See RLC circuit.
 Third- and higher-order filters are defined similarly.  In general, the final rate of power rolloff for an order- all-pole filter is 6 dB per octave (20 dB per decade).

On any Butterworth filter, if one extends the horizontal line to the right and the diagonal line to the upper-left (the asymptotes of the function), they intersect at exactly the cutoff frequency, 3 dB below the horizontal line.  The various types of filters (Butterworth filter, Chebyshev filter, Bessel filter, etc.) all have different-looking knee curves.  Many second-order filters have "peaking" or resonance that puts their frequency response above the horizontal line at this peak.

The meanings of 'low' and 'high'—that is, the cutoff frequency—depend on the characteristics of the filter. The term "low-pass filter" merely refers to the shape of the filter's response; a high-pass filter could be built that cuts off at a lower frequency than any low-pass filter—it is their responses that set them apart.  Electronic circuits can be devised for any desired frequency range, right up through microwave frequencies (above 1 GHz) and higher.

Laplace notation
Continuous-time filters can also be described in terms of the Laplace transform of their impulse response, in a way that lets all characteristics of the filter be easily analyzed by considering the pattern of poles and zeros of the Laplace transform in the complex plane. (In discrete time, one can similarly consider the Z-transform of the impulse response.)

For example, a first-order low-pass filter can be described in Laplace notation as:

where s is the Laplace transform variable, τ is the filter time constant, and K is the gain of the filter in the passband.

Electronic low-pass filters

First order

RC filter 

One simple low-pass filter circuit consists of a resistor in series with a load, and a capacitor in parallel with the load. The capacitor exhibits reactance, and blocks low-frequency signals, forcing them through the load instead. At higher frequencies the reactance drops, and the capacitor effectively functions as a short circuit. The combination of resistance and capacitance gives the time constant of the filter  (represented by the Greek letter tau). The break frequency, also called the turnover frequency, corner frequency, or cutoff frequency (in hertz), is determined by the time constant:

or equivalently (in radians per second):

This circuit may be understood by considering the time the capacitor needs to charge or discharge through the resistor:
 At low frequencies, there is plenty of time for the capacitor to charge up to practically the same voltage as the input voltage.
 At high frequencies, the capacitor only has time to charge up a small amount before the input switches direction. The output goes up and down only a small fraction of the amount the input goes up and down. At double the frequency, there's only time for it to charge up half the amount.

Another way to understand this circuit is through the concept of reactance at a particular frequency:
 Since direct current (DC) cannot flow through the capacitor, DC input must flow out the path marked  (analogous to removing the capacitor).
 Since alternating current (AC) flows very well through the capacitor, almost as well as it flows through solid wire, AC input flows out through the capacitor, effectively short circuiting to ground (analogous to replacing the capacitor with just a wire).

The capacitor is not an "on/off" object (like the block or pass fluidic explanation above).  The capacitor variably acts between these two extremes.  It is the Bode plot and frequency response that show this variability.

RL filter

A resistor–inductor circuit or RL filter is an electric circuit composed of resistors and inductors driven by a voltage or current source. A first order RL circuit is composed of one resistor and one inductor and is the simplest type of RL circuit.

A first order RL circuit is one of the simplest analogue infinite impulse response electronic filters. It consists of a resistor and an inductor, either in series driven by a voltage source or in parallel driven by a current source.

Second order

RLC filter

An RLC circuit  (the letters R, L and C can be in a different sequence) is an electrical circuit consisting of a resistor, an inductor, and a capacitor, connected in series or in parallel.  The RLC part of the name is due to those letters being the usual electrical symbols for resistance, inductance and capacitance respectively.  The circuit forms a harmonic oscillator for current and will resonate in a similar way as an LC circuit will.  The main difference that the presence of the resistor makes is that any oscillation induced in the circuit will die away over time if it is not kept going by a source.  This effect of the resistor is called damping. The presence of the resistance also reduces the peak resonant frequency somewhat.  Some resistance is unavoidable in real circuits, even if a resistor is not specifically included as a component.  An ideal, pure LC circuit is an abstraction for the purpose of theory.

There are many applications for this circuit.  They are used in many different types of oscillator circuits.  Another important application is for tuning, such as in radio receivers or television sets, where they are used to select a narrow range of frequencies from the ambient radio waves.  In this role the circuit is often referred to as a tuned circuit.  An RLC circuit can be used as a band-pass filter, band-stop filter, low-pass filter or high-pass filter. The RLC filter is described as a second-order circuit, meaning that any voltage or current in the circuit can be described by a second-order differential equation in circuit analysis.

Higher order passive filters 
Higher order passive filters can also be constructed (see diagram for a third order example).

Active electronic realization

Another type of electrical circuit is an active low-pass filter.

In the operational amplifier circuit shown in the figure, the cutoff frequency (in hertz) is defined as:

or equivalently (in radians per second):

The gain in the passband is −R2/R1, and the stopband drops off at −6 dB per octave (that is −20 dB per decade) as it is a first-order filter.

See also

 Baseband

References

External links 

 Low Pass Filter java simulator
 ECE 209: Review of Circuits as LTI Systems, a short primer on the mathematical analysis of (electrical) LTI systems.
 ECE 209: Sources of Phase Shift, an intuitive explanation of the source of phase shift in a low-pass filter. Also verifies simple passive LPF transfer function by means of trigonometric identity.

Signal processing
Linear filters
Synthesiser modules
Filter frequency response
Acoustics
Sound